The Tom Ridge Stakes is an American Thoroughbred horse race run at Presque Isle Downs in Erie, Pennsylvania. First run in 2007, it was originally known as the Tom Ridge Labor Day Stakes when it was run the first two years on Labor Day. The race is a six-furlong event for three-year-old horses and is raced on Tapeta synthetic dirt.

It currently offers a purse of $100,000.

The race is named for Tom Ridge, who was the Governor of the State of Pennsylvania from 1995 to 2001.

Records
Speed  record:
 1:08.16 - Noholdingback Bear (2016) (at current distance of 6 furlongs)

Winners

Flat horse races for three-year-olds
Recurring sporting events established in 2007
Sports in Erie, Pennsylvania
Ungraded stakes races in the United States